The 1999 season was the Jacksonville Jaguars' 5th in the National Football League and their fifth under head coach Tom Coughlin. Wide receiver Jimmy Smith set a franchise record for most receptions and receiving yards in one season. Smith would finish second in the NFL in receiving yards with 1,636 yards. The Jaguars’ regular season record of 14–2 still stands as their best record in franchise history. This would be the last time Jacksonville made the playoffs until 2005, the last season the team won a playoff game until 2007 and the last time the Jaguars won any division title until they won the AFC South title in 2017. 

The Jaguars hired former Carolina Panthers head coach Dom Capers to be their defensive coordinator. Under Capers, the team went from 25th in 1998 to 4th in 1999 in total defense. The Jaguars defense yielded the fewest points in the NFL with 217 (an average of 13.6 points per game).

Pro Football Reference, however, argues that the 1999 Jaguars had the fifth-easiest schedule of any NFL team between 1971 and 2017. Both regular season losses were to the Tennessee Titans, and they lost again to Tennessee in the AFC Championship Game, making the Titans the only team to beat them the entire season; Jacksonville would not reach the AFC Championship again until 2017. However, the only other occasion the Jaguars opposed a team with a winning record was their demolition of the 9–7 Dolphins in the divisional playoff. Most significantly, Jacksonville missed Super Bowl champion St. Louis, despite defeating the other four teams then comprising the NFC West – including a 41–3 destruction of the San Francisco 49ers on opening day – while their non-division conference opponents were Broncos and Jets outfits weakened by injuries to Terrell Davis and Vinny Testaverde.

Offseason

NFL draft

Personnel

Staff

Roster

Regular season

Schedule

Note: Intra-division opponents are in bold text.

Standings

Postseason

AFC Divisional Playoffs: vs (6) Miami Dolphins

The Jaguars number one defense forced seven Miami turnovers as the Jaguars won in one of the most lopsided games in NFL playoff history. The Jaguars were up 24–0 after the 1st quarter. The game was so one-sided that the Jaguars were up 41–0 in the 2nd quarter before the Dolphins were finally able to score. The highlight of the game was Fred Taylor’s 90-yard touchdown run in the 1st quarter. This was the last game for both Miami quarterback Dan Marino and coach Jimmy Johnson.

AFC Championship: vs (4) Tennessee Titans

The Jaguars became the first team in NFL history to lose three games to the same team in the same season, with the third loss occurring as the home team (every team until this point had lost a third game on the road). Even though the Titans had four turnovers, the Jaguars had six which proved to be their downfall. The Jaguars failed to score in the second half, in part due to the Titans defense which forced four turnovers after halftime. The game started to fall out of the Jaguars reach when in the third quarter, with the Titans up 17–14, Mark Brunell was sacked in the end zone for a safety. Then on the next play, Derrick Mason returned the kickoff 80 yards for a touchdown, giving the Titans 9 points in just 17 seconds, putting them up 26–14. The Jaguars never recovered, and thus finished the season 0–3 versus the Titans, but 15–0 versus all remaining opponents.

Awards and records
 Aaron Beasley, Franchise Record, Most Interceptions in One Season, (6)
 Mike Hollis, Franchise Record (tied), Most Field Goals in One Season, (31)
 Jimmy Smith, Franchise Record, Most Receptions in One Season, (116)
 Jimmy Smith, Franchise Record, Most Receiving Yards in One Season, (1,636)
 Jimmy Smith, NFL Leader, Receptions, (116)

Notes

References

 Jaguars Schedule on jt-sw.com

Jacksonville Jaguars
Jacksonville Jaguars seasons
AFC Central championship seasons
Jackson